Makhdoom Syed Sami Ul Hassan Gillani  is a Pakistani politician who has been a member of the National Assembly of Pakistan since August 2018.

Political career
He was elected to the National Assembly of Pakistan from Constituency NA-174 (Bahawalpur-V) as a candidate of Pakistan Tehreek-e-Insaf in 2018 Pakistani general election. He bagged 63884 against Syed Ali Hassan Gilani in election 2018.

External Link

More Reading
 List of members of the 15th National Assembly of Pakistan

References

Living people
Pakistani MNAs 2018–2023
Pakistan Tehreek-e-Insaf MNAs
Year of birth missing (living people)